Ottavio Farnese (Parma, 20 December 1598 – Parma, 1643) was an Italian nobleman. He was an illegitimate son of Ranuccio I Farnese, Duke of Parma and Briseide Ceretoli, who was at that time unmarried; she was the daughter of Ottavio Ceretoli, a captain who had died in Flanders in the following of Alessandro Farnese, Duke of Parma. The couple also had an illegitimate daughter, Isabella.

In 1600 Ranuccio married Margherita Aldobrandini, grandchild of pope Clement VIII. The marriage was initially childless, so in 1605 Ranuccio legitimised Ottavio and recognised him as his successor in order to secure an heir for the dukedom. From 1607 to 1620 Ottavio was lord of Borgo San Donnino, Fiorenzuola, Val di Nure, Leonessa, Cittaducale, Montereale, Penne, Campli, Ortona, Altamura, Castellamare and Roccaguglielma. The suggestion that he married Sofronia Sanvitale, daughter of Girolamo, marchese of Sala Baganza and Colorno, is spurious; she never existed.

In 1610 Ranuccio's wife had a son, Alessandro, but he proved to be deaf and was felt incapable of succeeding him. In 1612 she had another male child, Odoardo, later followed by two daughters and one more son. After ten years of marriage, Ranuccio now had legitimate male issue and so recognised Odoardo as his heir instead of Ottavio. Ottavio thus organised a conspiracy against his father, but this failed and he was stripped of his titles and imprisoned in Parma in 1621, dying in prison twenty-one years later, probably of the plague.

References

1598 births
1643 deaths
Ottavio
Illegitimate children of Italian monarchs
Sons of monarchs